Castle Archdale in County Fermanagh, Northern Ireland is a former estate on the shores of Lough Erne Lower, the key feature of which today is Castle Archdale Country Park. There is also a caravan park. The former estate is situated near Lisnarick and Irvinestown, in the broader hinterland of Enniskillen, and the park is owned and run by the Northern Ireland Environment Agency.

History 
 The park was once an estate owned by the Archdale family, who arrived in 1614 during the Plantation of Ulster. The castle was built in 1615 by John Archdale (died 1621), a Plantation undertaker from Norfolk. The castle was built on a T-plan with a defensive bawn 66 ft by 64 ft and 15 ft high with flankers at each corner. He was succeeded by his son, Edward. The castle was destroyed for the first time by Rory Maguire during the Irish Rebellion of 1641. It destroyed again in 1689, during the Williamite wars. In the 18th century, a mansion was built, but all that now remains is a huge cobbled courtyard surrounded by white outbuildings, housing an information centre and tearooms. The ruins of the old castle itself are situated in the old area of the park.

World War II 
During World War II, RAF Castle Archdale housed up to 2,500 people and was a major base for flying boats. PBY Catalinas and Short Sunderlands flew from Castle Archdale to protect Atlantic shipping from German U-boats. Today's caravan site sits on the concrete maintenance area where aircraft were serviced, and a museum in the park holds exhibits from the World War II period.

Transport 
 There is a ferry to White Island which leaves from Castle Archdale marina.
 Castle Archdale private railway station opened on 13 June 1866, but finally closed on 3 July 1950.

Sport
A range of water and land based activities are available from a commercial outlet located in the marina car park.

References

Links
 Culture Northern Ireland

 

Northern Ireland coast and countryside
Northern Ireland Environment Agency properties
Nature reserves in Northern Ireland
Protected areas of County Fermanagh
Museums in County Fermanagh
World War II museums in the United Kingdom
Military and war museums in Northern Ireland
Register of Parks, Gardens and Demesnes of Special Historic Interest